Iruya is a small town of population 1,070 in northwestern Argentina. It is located in the Salta Province of northwestern Argentina, and is the capital of the Iruya Department.

Overview
There is no direct road connection to the rest of the Salta province and access is through a road to the adjacent Jujuy province, a  portion of which is unpaved.
Nonetheless, the town is popular with tourists for its scenic location and townscape and friendly locals.
8 km north of Iruya there is the village of San Isidro, 7 km north there is the village of San Juan, 6 km south there is the village of Pueblo Viejo.

Iruya's name is derived from the Quechua language, meaning "abundance of straw".

History 
Iruya was officially founded in 1753, but the first inhabitants settled here around 100 years earlier. They were mainly aboriginals of which the oldest roots go back to the Ocloyas, a people belonging to the ethnic group of the Kolla who stem from the Kollasuyo, which used to be one of the four regions of the Inca empire.

Iruya's church was built in 1690.

Climate

See also 
 Chiyayoc
 La Mesada

References 

Populated places in Salta Province
Populated places established in the 17th century